Susan Mitchell is an American poet

Susan Mitchell may also refer to:
 Susan Langstaff Mitchell, Irish writer and poet
 Susan Mitchell (Australian author)